The following is a list of notable Cuban track and field athletes.

List
 Alberto Juantorena, basketball, track
 Aliecer Urrutia, triple jump
 Ana Fidelia Quirot, 800 m 
 Dayron Robles, Hurdling athlete 
 Emeterio González, javelin thrower.
 Héctor Herrera, sprinter
 Ioamnet Quintero, high jumper
 Iván García, sprinter
 Iván Pedroso, long jump
 Javier Sotomayor, track and field record setter
 Joel Isasi, sprinter
 Joel Lamela, sprinter
 Jorge Aguilera, sprinter
 Lázaro Martínez, sprinter
 Luis Alberto Pérez-Rionda, sprinter
 Osleidys Menéndez, javelin
 Roberto Hernández 
 Roberto Moya, discus throw
 Víctor Moya, high jumper
 Yargelis Savigne, jump
 Yipsi Moreno, hammer thrower
 Yoandri Betanzos, triple jump
 Yoel García, triple jumper
 Yoel Hernández, hurdler
 Yudelkis Fernández, long jumper
 Yunaika Crawford, hammer thrower 
 Yuniel Hernández, hurdler

References

Athletes

Cuban